Priya Banerjee is an Indian actress who works mainly in Hindi, Telugu and Tamil films. Banerjee's first film  was Kiss in Telugu in 2013, opposite Adivi Sesh. She then appeared in her second Telugu film, Joru, with Sundeep Kishan and Raashii Khanna as the other leads.

Career
Banerjee started her career in 2013, with the Telugu film Kiss as Priya. In 2014, she acted in the film Joru as Annu. In 2015, she appeared in her third Telugu film, Asura as Harika opposite Nara Rohit.

In October 2015, Banerjee made her Bollywood debut with Sanjay Gupta's Jazbaa as Sia. The film starred Aishwarya Rai and Irrfan Khan however it failed at the box office and was declared a flop. In 2016, she acted in Karan Johar's Baar Baar Dekho, starring Sidharth Malhotra and Katrina Kaif.

In 2017, Banerjee started the year with 2016 The End, which released in the month of October, playing the main lead of Sheetal opposite Harshad Chopda. She later acted in T-Series's Dil Jo Na Keh Saka opposite Himansh Kohli as Sona. She also played Mrya in her third release of that year, Social.

In 2018, she acted in the film, Rain In 2019, she started the year with acting in the Tamil film Chithiram Pesuthadi 2. She made her web debut with ALT Balaji's Baarish in April 2019, starring Asha Negi and Vikram Singh Chauhan. She later returned to the series in season 2 in 2020. In May 2019, Banerjee played one of the leads as Kashti for Ekta Kapoor's Bekaaboo which aired on ALT Balaji opposite Rajeev Siddharth. In June 2019, Banerjee acted in Mahendra Bohra's thriller Bollywood film, Hume Tumse Pyaar Kitna opposite Karanvir Bohra.

Banerjee made her place in The Times Of India's "Most Desirable Women List" and was ranked at No. 22 in 2020.

Filmography

Web series

References

External links

 

Actresses from Calgary
Canadian film actresses
Living people
Actresses in Telugu cinema
Actresses in Tamil cinema
Actresses in Hindi cinema
Canadian people of Indian descent
1991 births